The Mechanicsburg Area School District is a midsized, suburban, public school district serving the Harrisburg suburbs of Mechanicsburg and Upper Allen Township in Cumberland County, Pennsylvania. According to the 2000 federal census data, it served a resident population of 25,901. In 2010, the population had grown to 28,664 people. The US  Census Bureau reported that district residents' per capita income was $23,507 while the median family income was $60,722 a year.

Mechanicsburg Area School District operates: Mechanicsburg Kindergarten Academy, Broad Street Elementary School, Elmwood Elementary School, Northside Elementary School, Shepherdstown Elementary School, Upper Allen Elementary School, Mechanicsburg Area Middle School and Mechanicsburg Area Senior High School. In addition, the District owns the Trails & Trees Environmental Center,  education area behind the middle school.

Extracurriculars
Mechanicsburg Area School District offers a wide variety of clubs, activities and an extensive sports program.

Sports
The District funds:

Boys
Baseball - AAAA
Basketball- AAAA
Cross Country - Class AAA
Football - AAAA
Golf -AAA
Soccer - AAA
Swimming and Diving - Class AAA
Tennis - AAA
Track and Field - AAA
Water Polo - Class AAAA
 Wrestling	 - AAA

Girls
Basketball - AAAA
Cross Country - AAA
Field Hockey - AAA
Golf - AAA
Soccer (Fall) - AAA
Softball - AAAA
Girls' Tennis - AAA
Track and Field - AAA
Volleyball - AAA
Water Polo - AAAA

Middle School Sports

Boys
Basketball
Cross County
Football
Soccer
Wrestling	

Girls
Basketball
Cross Country
Field Hockey
Volleyball

According to PIAA directory July 2012

References

Susquehanna Valley
School districts in Cumberland County, Pennsylvania